NPS (Nederlandse Programma Stichting) (English: Dutch Programme Foundation) was a Dutch government-funded radio and TV broadcasting foundation.

In the Dutch public broadcasting system, broadcasters – in the Dutch context, listener and viewer associations – do not have their own stations but are allotted time on the three public television and eight public radio networks broadly in relation to the size of their respective memberships. The NPS, however, does not have any members. It was created on 28 April 1994, following a split-up of the responsibilities of the Nederlandse Omroep Stichting (NOS). The NPS took over the NOS's culture, information, minorities and youth programming, allowing the NOS to concentrate on its role of providing impartial news coverage. On 1 September 2010 the NPS merged with Teleac and RVU into NTR.

Proposed abolition
In the summer of 2005, Jan Peter Balkenende's second cabinet presented plans to renovate the broadcasting system, including abolition of the NPS by 2007. The proposal was met with fierce resistance from many viewers and listeners, given the dedicated and fairly sizeable audience for the NPS's output. The idea was that other broadcasters would take over the type of programming that the NPS had previously provided.

There was little confidence among viewers, however, that this would actually happen. It was speculated at the time that the real motive for the proposed abolition was that the governing parties (Christian Democrat and liberal conservative) saw the foundation's output as being too left-wing. The plans were in the end withdrawn following the elections of November 2006.

External links
 Nederlandse Programma Stichting

Television in the Netherlands
Netherlands Public Broadcasting
Dutch-language television networks
Television channels and stations established in 1995
Radio stations established in 1995